Ateshkadeh or Atashkadeh may refer to:
 Fire temple, a Zoroastrian place of worship.
 Ateshkadeh-ye Olya
 Ateshkadeh-ye Sofla
 William Atashkadeh - Swedish-Iranian footballer